The Sextet in C major for piano, violin, viola, cello, clarinet and horn, Op. 37, was composed by Ernst von Dohnányi in 1935.

History 
The sextet was written in 1935 during a lengthy period of illness, during which Dohnányi was bedridden with a thrombosis for several months. It was premiered on 17 June 1935.

Structure 

The sextet consists of four movements:

Reception 
A reviewer for the Budapesti Hírlap, who attended the premiere on 17 June 1935, wrote favorably of the work: "One of the sextet's greatest values is that it is melodically original. Every tune is invented, not borrowed, and not based on a quotation."

References

External links 

Compositions for piano sextet
Compositions for clarinet
Compositions for horn
Compositions by Ernst von Dohnányi
1935 compositions
Compositions in C major